Wayne David Harrison AM (born in East Melbourne, Australia in 1953) is an Australian director, writer, producer and performer.

Biography
Harrison was a child and teenage star performing on stage and television, including performing in J.C. Williamsons' musicals. He moved to Sydney in 1975.

In 1977 Harrison enrolled at the University of New South Wales (UNSW) and completed an Honours Degree majoring in history.

In 1979 Harrison began working on the magazine Campaign as news editor, and later editor.  With Les McDonald, he opened "The Bookshop Darlinghurst" in Darlinghurst in 1983. In 1981 after meeting Richard Wherrett, then artistic director of the recently formed Sydney Theatre Company (STC) in Sydney, he was appointed the company's Literary Manager/Resident Dramaturg. He took over from Wherrett as Director of the STC in 1990 and served as Director/CEO until 1999.

From 1999 to 2001, he was the Creative Director of SFX/Back Row and Clear Channel Entertainment (Europe).

In 2005–2007 Harrison was the Creative Director of Sydney's New Year's Eve event. 2007 he was the director of the Helpmann Awards for Live Performance Australia. In 2006 he co-wrote and directed the Spiegelworld circus cabaret sensation Absinthe which played in New York and Miami, before taking up residency in a custom-built Spiegeltent on the grounds of Caesar's Palace, Las Vegas in 2011, where it is still running.

In 2006 he was the director of the 2006 Commonwealth Games closing ceremony, held in Melbourne, as well as the director of the touring production of 2 Weeks with the Queen for Adelaide's Windmill Theatre Arts and End of the Rainbow in Sydney, Melbourne and the Edinburgh Festival.

Career
1995: Directed Dead White Males by David Williamson (world première) for the Sydney Theatre Company.
1996: Directed Heretic, by David Williamson (world première) for the Sydney Theatre Company.
2002: Directed Mum's The Word Robert C Kelly Limited (English tour); also directed Alone It Stands for Mollison Productions.
2004: Directed Through the Wire, National Theatre Connections.
2005: Directed The Return of Houdini (Variety Magic show), City Theatre, Reykjavík, Iceland.
2008: Director of Codgers Directed and wrote Absinthe and Desir for Spiegelworld in New York and Miami.
2011: Directed and wrote Absinthe for Spiegelworld at Caesars Palace in Las Vegas.

Honours
On 11 June 2012, Harrison was named a Member of the Order of Australia for "service to the arts as a director, writer, producer and performer, to Australian cultural life, and as a supporter of emerging talent."

References

External links

1953 births
Living people
Australian theatre directors
Theatre directors from Melbourne
Members of the Order of Australia